Freeman Darnell Davis (born April 1, 1975) is an American gospel musician and recording artist, music producer, and worship leader. He started his music career, in 2007, and has since released two studio albums. His second studio album, Moving Forward, was his breakthrough release upon the Billboard magazine charts.

Early life
Davis was born, Freeman Darnell Davis, on April 1, 1975, in Minneapolis, Minnesota, the son of Freeman Davis and Shirley Jean Bogan.

Music career
His music recording career began with The Remnant in 2007, with their first studio album, Psalms of the Remnant, that was released on February 6, 2007, with FS Records. The subsequent studio album, Moving Forward, was released on March 25, 2014, from RCA Inspiration. This album was his breakthrough release upon the Billboard magazine charts, while it placed on the Gospel Albums and Heatseekers Albums charts, where it peaked at Nos. 17 and 41, correspondingly. The album was nominated for Traditional Gospel Album at the 45th GMA Dove Awards.

Personal life
He married Edwarnese Alaine Spearman, on October 25, 1997, while they reside in Minneapolis, Minnesota.

Discography

References

External links
 Official website

Living people
1975 births
African-American jazz musicians
African-American Christians
Musicians from Minneapolis
Songwriters from Minnesota
20th-century American musicians
21st-century American musicians
Jazz musicians from Minnesota
African-American songwriters
20th-century African-American musicians
21st-century African-American musicians